Hokkaido Sapporo Intercultural and Technological High School (北海道札幌国際情報高等学校, Hokkaidō Sapporo Kokusai Jōhō Kōtō Gakkō) is a high school in Sapporo, Hokkaidō, Japan, founded in 1995. Hokkaido Sapporo Intercultural and Technological High School is one of high schools administrated by Hokkaido.

The school is operated by the Hokkaido Prefectural Board of Education.

Notable alumni
Tatsuki Nara (奈良 竜樹) Japanese footballer who plays in J1 League club Kawasaki Frontale.
Hidenari Kanayama (金山 英勢) Japanese luger who competed at the 2014 Winter Olympics.
Ami Kusakari (草刈 愛美) Japanese musician, and the bassist of Sakanaction.

Address
Address: Shinkawa 717-1, Kita-ku, Sapporo, Hokkaido, Japan

External links
The Official Website of Hokkaido Sapporo Intercultural and Technological High School

High schools in Hokkaido
Educational institutions established in 1995
1995 establishments in Japan